No. 259 Squadron RAF was a Royal Air Force Squadron formed in Africa as a  reconnaissance and anti-submarine unit in World War II.

History

World War I
No. 259 Squadron Royal Flying Corps was authorized to form on 20 August 1918 but there is no evidence that it did so, and it was formally disbanded on 14 January 1919.

Formation in World War II
The squadron formed on 16 February 1943 at Kipevu, Kenya and flew anti-submarine patrols over the Indian Ocean equipped with Catalinas. Detachments of the squadron were based at Dar-es-Salaam, Diego Suarez, Khormaksar, Masirah, Port Victoria, Tulear, Lake St. Lucia in South Africa  and Mauritius. The squadron was disbanded on 1 May 1945 by which time it was re-equipping with Sunderlands.

Aircraft operated

References

External links
 History of No.'s 256–260 Squadrons at RAF Web
 259 Squadron history on the official RAF website

259
Military units and formations established in 1918
1918 establishments in the United Kingdom
Military units and formations in Aden in World War II
Military units and formations disestablished in 1919
Military units and formations established in 1943
Military units and formations disestablished in 1945